The 1979 Washington Huskies football team was an American football team that represented the University of Washington during the 1979 NCAA Division I-A football season.  In its fifth season under head coach Don James, the team compiled a  finished in second place in the Pacific-10 Conference, and outscored its opponents 

The two conference losses were to Arizona State and USC; Arizona State later vacated its wins due to  Washington won the Apple Cup over Washington State for a sixth consecutive  and the Sun Bowl over 

Defensive back Mark Lee was selected as the team's most valuable player.  Phil Foreman, Doug Martin, Antowaine Richardson, and Joe Steele were the team captains.

Schedule

Roster

NFL Draft selections
Eight University of Washington Huskies were selected in the 1980 NFL Draft, which lasted twelve rounds with 333 selections.

References

Washington
Washington Huskies football seasons
Sun Bowl champion seasons
Washington Huskies football